The 2017 Seongnam FC season is the club's first season in K League Challenge since its establishment in 1989 as Ilhwa Chunma Football Club and in its current name, Seongnam FC. The team will also competing in the 2017 Korean FA Cup.

Pre-season 

Seongnam FC set up the pre-season plan to stay in Namhae, Mokpo and Murcia, Spain.

Namhae, 05-15 Jan 2017 
Seongnam FC focused on fitness training in Namhae.

Mokpo, 15-27 Jan 2017 

Seongnam FC had practice matches against University teams and a Korea National League side nearby.

Murcia, Spain, 1-23 Feb 2017 

Seongnam FC stayed in Murcia and had practice matches in Pinatar Arena Football Center. All the schedule were coordinated by an agent, HMSports.

After the match against FC Cartagena, Seongnam FC squad return to South Korea, arriving on 23rd Feb 2017.

Club Announcements 
 31 Mar 2017: The club announced that the sales figure of 2017 season ticket by far reached to 7,035. This is the best season ticket sales record in the club history. 
 3 Mar 2017: The club announced that the new signing from U-18 team(Poongsang High) - Lee Shi-hwan. 
 27 Feb 2017: The club announced that the sales figure of 2017 season ticket reached to 6,034 by then. It is similar to the last season. 
 25 Feb 2017: Seongnam FC held the opening ceremony of 2017 season at AK Plaza Bundang, Seohyeon Station. Bae Seung-jin is announced as the captain for the season.
 20 Feb 2017: The club announced the number of season ticket sales reached to 5,048. The season ticket postings are started on the day. Also launched a collaborated merchandise with Oxford.
 18 Feb 2017: The last recruit before 2017 Season, Dario Vidosic is announced.
 17 Feb 2017: Home & Away Kit by Umbro is revealed.
 13 Feb 2017: Seongnam FC renewed the contract with Kim Jung-min, FIFA Online pro-gamer.
 12 Feb 2017: New signing Park Sung-ho joined the squad.
 9 Feb 2017: The fixture of 2017 1st Half Open Youth Test of Seongnam FC is announced.
 7 Feb 2017: Back numbers for 2017 K League Challenge is revealed.
 3 Feb 2017: Marin Oršulić officially joined Seongnam.
 19 Jan 2017: Seongnam FC unveiled the signing from Gwangju FC, Oh Do-hyun.
 10 Jan 2017: Sponsorship agreement between the club and NHN Entertainment is on the news.
 9 Jan 2017: Seongnam FC announced their sponsorship to Coexistence of Animal Rights on Earth and to 'Biscuit' an abandoned dog in CARE Abandoned Dog Shelter.
 7 Jan 2017: Jeon Sang-wook (footballer) rejoined Seongnam FC as U-10 team coach, after his recovery from Nasopharynx cancer.
 6 Jan 2017: Shim Je-hyeok joined the team from FC Seoul as a loan player.
 5 Jan 2017: The club announced Neco joined the team.
 4 Jan 2017: Yang Dong-won moved from Gangwon FC to Seongnam FC.
 3 Jan 2017: An Jae-jun joined Seongnam FC from Incheon United as a free agent.
 2 Jan 2017: Seongnam FC announced An Sang-hyun puts pen to paper to renew his contract with the club.
 1 Jan 2017:Oh Jang-eun joined Seongnam FC from the archrival Suwon Samsung Bluewings.

Squad

Out on loan

Competitions

Overview 

{| class="wikitable" style="text-align: center"
|-
!rowspan=2|Competition
!colspan=8|Record
|-
!
!
!
!
!
!
!
!
|-
| K League Challenge

|-
| FA Cup

|-
! Total

K League Challenge

Results summary

Korean FA Cup 

Seongnam FC participates in 2017 Korean FA Cup from Round 3 as K League Challenge team.

On 7 March 2017, in 2017 Korean FA Cup 3, 4 Rounds Draw, Seongnam FC were drawn against Suwon FC. The original draw was Suwon FC's home, but it is decided as Seongnam FC's home due to Suwon's absence at the draw.

Tickets

Season Ticket 

On 13 December 2016, the club started the sales of 2017 Seongnam FC season ticket. The first purchase was made by the chairman, Lee Jae-myung and he triggered a 'Pass-Pass Relay' campaign. The campaign is a season ticket holder to nominated participants to purchase Seongnam FC season ticket.

Sales Period 
 Early Bird Sales: 21 December 2016 10:00(KST) - 20 January 2017
 General Sales: 21 January - 28 April 2017
 Sold at Tancheon Sports Complex on Seongnam FC home games, or via Interpark website.

Prices 

* Currency is Korean Won.

* Corporate Season Ticket Set is consist of a Ticket book, SFC Umbrella and SFC Calendar.

References

External links 
 Official Website 
 Official K League website 
 Official K League Website 

1
Seongnam FC seasons
South Korean football clubs 2017 season